The 1956–57 SK Rapid Wien season was the 59th season in club history.

Squad

Squad and statistics

Squad statistics

Fixtures and results

League

European Cup

Mitropa Cup

References

1956-57 Rapid Wien Season
Rapid
Austrian football championship-winning seasons